Hiza’iti Wedi Cheber is a reservoir located in the Inderta woreda of the Tigray Region in Ethiopia. The earthen dam that holds the reservoir was built in 1997 by the Tigray Bureau of Agriculture and Natural Resources.

Dam characteristics 
 Dam height: 14.5 metres
 Dam crest length: 598 metres
 Spillway width: 30 metres
 Original capacity: 1 240 000 m³
 Designed irrigated area: 80 ha
 Actual irrigated area in 2002: 50 ha

Environment 
The catchment of the reservoir is 33 km² large, with a perimeter of 24.6 km and a length of 6910 metres. The reservoir suffers from rapid siltation. The lithology of the catchment is Antalo Limestone and Mekelle Dolerite. Part of the water that could be used for irrigation is lost through seepage; the positive side-effect is that this contributes to groundwater recharge. Actually the whole valley bottom down to Chelekwot benefits from this seepage water, that emerges in various springs and is particularly used for irrigation agriculture.

References 

Reservoirs in Ethiopia
1997 establishments in Ethiopia
Tigray Region